Antonella Baldini (born 11 May 1966) is an Italian voice actress.

Biography
Baldini contributes to voicing characters in anime, cartoons, movies, and other media. She provides the voice of the protagonist Timmy Turner in the Italian-language version of the long running Nickelodeon animated series The Fairly OddParents.  She also provides the voice of the character Hayley Smith in the Italian-language version of the animated sitcom American Dad! and Gosalyn Mallard in the Italian dub of Darkwing Duck.

Her siblings, Rita, Nanni and Oreste are also voice artists.  Antonella works at Dubbing Brothers, LaBibi.it, C.D. Cine Dubbing and other dubbing studios in Italy.

Voice work

Anime and animation
 Hange Zoë in Attack on Titan
 Timmy Turner in The Fairly OddParents
 Beth in Total Drama series
 Amy Rose in Sonic X
 Hayley Smith in American Dad!
 Ayame Sarutobi in Gin Tama
 Buddy in Dinosaur Train
 Vana Glama in Sidekick
 Dan Bashin in Battle Spirits: Shōnen Gekiha Dan
 Rei in Shinzo
 Ms. Marvel in The Super Hero Squad Show
 Ursula Scott in George of the Jungle (2007 TV series)
 Tira Misu in Sorcerer Hunters
 Miranda Jones in Transformers: Energon
 Penelope in Barbie as Rapunzel
 Gosalyn Mallard in Darkwing Duck
 Fang in Dave the Barbarian
 Azusa Shiga in Laughing Target
 Maetel in Maetel Legend
 Amber in Dink, the Little Dinosaur
 Bradley in Stickin' Around
 Macie Lightfoot in As Told by Ginger
 Yae Oda in Nabari no Ou
 Rakshata Chawla in Code Geass: Lelouch of the Rebellion
 Daffodil in Clifford's Puppy Days
 Buzz in Freakazoid!
 Hakudoshi in InuYasha: The Final Act
 Rolly in 101 Dalmatians: The Series
 Emma in Four Eyes!
 Isabelle in Eliot Kid
 Rosa Santos in Maya & Miguel
 Georgie in Georgie!
 Rubble in PAW Patrol
 Anne Shipley in Anne of Green Gables
 Beth in Watch My Chops
 Melody Locus in My Life as a Teenage Robot
 Huey Duck in Quack Pack
 Junior Asparagus in VeggieTales
 Sidetable Drawer in Blue's Clues
 Tiger's Mom in Kipper
 Maria in Harvey Girls Forever!
 Mie Delgado in Battle B-Daman
 Moemi Hayakawa in Video Girl Ai
 Erica in Tomodachi Life: The TV Series
 Iggy in Camp Candy
 Ling Jouyan in Legend of the Dragon
 Backpack in Dora the Explorer
 Creepie Creecher in Growing Up Creepie
 Tasha in The Backyardigans
 Ranmaru and Lalissa in Haikara-san ga Tōru
 Steelheart in SilverHawks
 Sylia Stingray in Bubblegum Crisis
 Princess Lana in Captain N: The Game Master
 Tina in The Little Flying Bears
 Arisa Sono in All Purpose Cultural Cat Girl Nuku Nuku
 Martin Morning in Martin Morning
 Yuri Tokikago in Mawaru Pingudoramu
 Ikuko Miyaura in A Letter to Momo
 Rudy Tabootie in ChalkZone

Live action shows and movies
 Cara in Legend of the Seeker
 Caitlin Todd in NCIS
 Kaurie Keller in Cougar Town
 Amy Duncan in Good Luck Charlie
 Rose in Two and a Half Men
 Vicki Greer in Old Dogs
 Lizzie Morrison in Dear Frankie
 Stevie in The Machinist
 Audrey Bingham in Rules of Engagement (TV series)
 Amelia "Mel" Silver in Waking the Dead (TV series)
 Catherine (Cat) Avery Pascal (1st voice) in Acapulco H.E.A.T.
 David Scali in The Commish
 Glenda Fry in Mortified
 Kimmy Kim in Pepper Dennis
 Carmie Batista in Ciao Bella
 Marguerite Krux in Sir Arthur Conan Doyle's The Lost World
 Veronica in Out of the Blue (1996 TV series)
 Paula Bell in Malice
 and others

See also
 List of American Dad! voice actors

References

External links
 
 

Living people
Actresses from Milan
Italian voice actresses
1966 births
20th-century Italian actresses
21st-century Italian actresses
Zecchino d'Oro singers